Kurt von Trojan (born Vienna, Austria, 1937   22 March 2006) was an Australian journalist and science fiction author. He had also been employed as a psychiatric nurse and a cinema projectionist.

He studied at the London Film School and the South Australian School of Art. (1976–1977)

Short fiction by von Trojan appeared in magazines including Terror Australis.

On 25 January 2006 he was diagnosed with bone and kidney cancer and told he had only a few months to live. On being given the prognosis he is reported to have told his doctors "Oh, I was hoping to squeeze a few more weeks in." . A final collection of short stories was published as a memorial by Altair Australia. 'When I Close My Eyes', the last published work by Kurt von Trojan was organized by Robert N Stephenson and proudly funded by the entire speculative fiction community. The book was printed and a copy presented to Kurt on his birthday. He died a few days later. Kurt von Trojan was the son of the Last Knight of Austria. Kurt won the International Pater Award, The Ian Reed Award, The Colin Thiele Award, The Tom Howard Award and was recognized by his unique voice in the literary world.

Bibliography

Long fiction
Bedmates, 1984
The Transing Syndrome, 1985, Nominated for the Ditmar Award, Best Australian Long Fiction, 1986
Mars in Scorpio, 1990, Wakefield Press, 
Tenocha, 1995, 
Coup, 1997, Permanent Press, from a grant from literature S.A. 
The Atrocity Shop, 1998,

Short fiction
The Man Who Snatched Marilyn's Body, 1994, published in Alien Shores, 1994, eds. Peter McNamara, Margaret Winch,

Non-fiction
Creative Writing: a no-nonsense approach, 1989 The Wednesday Press,

External links

1937 births
2006 deaths
Deaths from bone cancer
Deaths from kidney cancer
Australian science fiction writers